Jürgen Rödel (born September 17, 1958 in Hof) is a German materials scientist and professor of non-metallic inorganic materials at the Technische Universität Darmstadt.

He is particularly well known for his fundamental and pioneering work on the mechanical and functional properties of ceramics. This includes his research work on the sintering behaviour of ceramics and the development of lead-free piezoceramics. Until then, lead-free piezo materials were considered impossible. Through meticulous research, he found the first lead-free systems with "Giant" elongation. In 2008, he received the Gottfried Wilhelm Leibniz Prize, the highest award for German researchers, for his contributions to the development of ferroelectric functional ceramics, new lead-free piezoelectric ceramics and novel gradient materials.

Life 
From 1977 to 1983, Rödel studied materials science at the University of Erlangen and ceramics at the University of Leeds. Rödel received his diploma in materials science from the University of Erlangen. In 1988, he received his Ph.D. in materials science from the University of California, Berkeley. In 1992, he habilitated in materials science at the TU Hamburg-Harburg. Since 1994 he has been professor of non-metallic inorganic materials at the Technische Universität Darmstadt.

Work 
In 2019, Rödel has acquired the research grant Reinhart-Koselleck project funded by the German Research Foundation (DFG). It was the first time for the Technische Universität Darmstadt that the grant was brought to the university. With the support he is currently working on improving ceramics by disrupting their atomic structure. His team is concentrating on a type of crystal defect that, although trivial for metals, has so far seemed unthinkable for hard ceramics. The mechanical deformation of ceramics takes place under controlled pressure and temperature.

Publications

Awards 

 1992: Heinz-Maier-Leibnitz-Preis
 2003: Fellow of the American Ceramic Society
 2008: Gottfried-Wilhelm-Leibniz-Preis
 2013: Member of the German Academy of Science and Engineering (Acatech)
 2016: IEEE Ferroelectrics Recognition Award
2018: Robert B. Sosman Award
2020: Fellow of the Materials Research Society

References

External links 
His Website at the Technische Universität Darmstadt

Gottfried Wilhelm Leibniz Prize winners
German materials scientists
Academic staff of Technische Universität Darmstadt
1958 births
Living people
University of Erlangen-Nuremberg alumni
University of California, Berkeley alumni
Fellows of the American Ceramic Society